Sulaymān ibn Dāwūd, known by the regnal name of Badr al-Dīn among the Isma'ili faithful, was the 26th and last imam of Hafizi Isma'ilism. Like his father, he spent most of his life in captivity at the hands of the Ayyubid dynasty.

Life
The Fatimid Caliphate had been ended by Saladin in 1171. In the aftermath, Saladin and his Ayyubid successors imprisoned the surviving members of the Fatimid dynasty, including the heir-apparent, Daoud ibn al-Adid, who was still recognized by the Hafizi Isma'ili faithful as their rightful imam. A series of pro-Fatimid conspiracies and uprisings in the 1170s failed to topple the new Ayyubid regime, and Daoud spent his life in prison, until his death in 1207–8.

Despite the separation of male and female prisoners, Daoud apparently managed to beget two sons, reportedly with slave women secretly smuggled into his chambers. Sulayman, given the epithet Badr al-Din by his followers, was the oldest. As soon as his mother had conceived him, she was reportedly smuggled to Upper Egypt, where pro-Fatimid sentiment lingered, and where her son was born. It was only later, likely under the Ayyubid sultan al-Kamil, that Sulayman was captured and confined in the Cairo Citadel, where the rest of the Fatimid clan was being held as well.

Sulayman died in 1248, apparently childless, thus ending the direct Fatimid line. Some Isma'ili partisans claimed that he had a son who was hidden—repeating the common motif of the 'Hidden Imam'. As late as 1298, a pretender claiming to be Daoud, the son of Sulayman, appeared in Upper Egypt, but by this time the Isma'ilis had been reduced to small isolated enclaves, the last traces of which end in the 14th century.

References

Sources
 
 

1248 deaths
Fatimid dynasty
Egyptian Ismailis
Hafizi imams
People who died in prison custody
Prisoners and detainees of the Ayyubid Sultanate
13th-century Arabs
13th-century Islamic religious leaders